Century Park, formerly transliterated as Shiji Park, is a station on Line 2 of the Shanghai Metro. It is named after the nearby Century Park (and is closest to Exit No. 7 of the park), and should not be confused with the Century Avenue station.

Places nearby
 Century Park
 Shanghai Science and Technology Museum

References
Metro #2 Station Name Change

Line 2, Shanghai Metro
Shanghai Metro stations in Pudong
Railway stations in China opened in 1999
Railway stations in Shanghai